Denise Galik-Furey (born December 4, 1950) is an American actress who has starred on television and in film.

Career
Born in Cleveland, Ohio, Galik has starred on television series and soap operas. Her first soap opera role was in the 1980s CBS show Knots Landing as Linda Stricker from 1980 to 1981. She has also appeared in Flamingo Road as Christie Kovacs and General Hospital as Rhonda Wexler from 1992 to 1994. Denise reprised her role as Rhonda Wexler on Port Charles in 1997 and 2001. Galik's other well-known television roles are on the short-lived television series The Best of Times as Kim Sedgewick and in the 1984 miniseries V: The Final Battle as Maggie Blodgett. She has made guest appearances on television series, including Welcome Back Kotter, Rhoda, The Incredible Hulk, The Eddie Capra Mysteries, The A-Team, Knight Rider, Magnum, P.I., and Law & Order: Criminal Intent.

She has also appeared in feature films. Her first movie role was in the 1975 movie The Happy Hooker; her other films include Next Stop, Greenwich Village (1976), California Suite (1978), Oh, God! Book II (1980), Don't Answer the Phone! (1980), Deadly Games (1982), Partners (1982), Get Crazy (1983), Eye of the Tiger (1986),  and Career Opportunities (1991).

External links

1950 births
Actresses from Cleveland
American film actresses
American soap opera actresses
American television actresses
20th-century American actresses
Living people
21st-century American women